Uważam Rze. Inaczej pisane was a Polish conservative weekly news weekly.

History
The weekly was launched on 7 February 2011 under the editorship of Paweł Lisicki. It was owned by Presspublica, which was bought by Polish businessman Grzegorz Hajdarowicz, months later. Within a couple of months, Uważam Rze became the third most popular Polish weekly, behind Gość Niedzielny and Polityka.

In April 2012, a monthly historical journal was launched — Uważam Rze Historia. In late November 2012, Hajdarowicz fired Lisicki, spurring a mass-resignation including Waldemar Łysiak, Marek Magierowski, Robert Mazurek, Bronisław Wildstein, and others; Jan Piński became the new editor. The last print-release was on 21 November 2016; it continued to be published on the web for a while.

Reception 
Joanna Michlic notes that Uważam Rze Historia served as one of the many venues where "right-wing ethno-nationalistic historians" promulgated an ahistorical view of Polish history esp. concerning Polish culpability in the Holocaust.

See also
 List of magazines in Poland

Notes

References

2011 establishments in Poland
Conservatism in Poland
Conservative magazines
Magazines established in 2011
Magazines published in Warsaw
Polish-language magazines
News magazines published in Poland
Weekly magazines published in Poland